Land of Love is a 1937 German romance film directed by Reinhold Schünzel and starring Albert Matterstock, Gusti Huber and Valerie von Martens. Although Schünzel was Jewish he had been allowed to continue directing films in Germany after the Nazi takeover. However, this film faced objections from the censors and from Joseph Goebbels. It was briefly shown and then disappeared from cinemas. It was Schünzel's final German film as director, and he went into exile shortly afterwards.

Cast

References

Bibliography

External links 
 

1937 films
1937 romantic comedy films
German romantic comedy films
Films of Nazi Germany
1930s German-language films
Films directed by Reinhold Schünzel
Films set in Europe
German black-and-white films
Tobis Film films
1930s German films